The Research Vessel Triton is a trimaran vessel owned by Gardline Marine Sciences Limited and a former prototype British warship demonstrator for the UK's Defence Evaluation and Research Agency (later QinetiQ). She was built as a technology demonstrator ship for the Royal Navy's Future Surface Combatant, and has been used to both prove the viability of the hull-form and as a trials platform for other QinetiQ innovations. The ship was used by the Australian Border Force's Marine Unit, and was for a time moored in the River Fal near the King Harry chain ferry. Up until July 2019 she was moored on the River Yare, Great Yarmouth in Norfolk, England.

Construction
In August 1998, the UK Ministry of Defence (MoD) awarded a contract to Vosper Thornycroft to construct the trimaran, at a cost of £13.5m RV Triton was launched at Woolston in May 2000 and delivered in August 2000. Triton then began a two-year risk reduction trials programme for the UK MoD and the US Department of Defense.

The vessel's three parallel hulls are reflected in her name which refers to the maritime god Triton who carried the three-pronged spear, the trident. The outriggers are thinner and much shorter than the dominant central hull.

Operational history

DERA and QinetiQ

Triton was designed as a demonstrator to prove that the trimaran concept would work successfully in a large warship. Following her launch in 2000, the ship began an extensive series of trials in 2001, which covered general ship handling, performance, sea-keeping behaviour, but also areas more specific to its design for which the  Royal Navy had no experience.  For example, a series of docking manoeuvres were undertaken by the pilot boats of HMNB Portsmouth to determine the problems of docking a large trimaran, and the ship underwent underway replenishment alongside  and the tanker  to ascertain the characteristics of a trimaran and a monohull replenishing at the same time. Triton also undertook the first helicopter take off and landing on a trimaran.

Gardline Marine Sciences
In January 2005, Triton was sold to Gardline Marine Sciences, a UK company based in Great Yarmouth, Norfolk. Triton was used for hydrographic survey work for the civil hydrography programme (CHP) on behalf of the Maritime and Coastguard Agency (MCA). The vessel was fitted with a sensor suite which includes the Kongsberg Simrad EM1002 multibeam echo-sounder, a GPS attitude/heading system, surface navigation and ultra-short baseline sub-surface acoustic tracking system, Gardline Voyager5 integrated survey system and Caris post-processing system.  The vessel was enhanced by Gardline by installing a bowthrust unit, additional accommodation and survey equipment facilities. In 2009, two new MTU engines were fitted; MTU 16v 4000 M40B. Output  each.

Australian Customs

In December 2006, Gardline contracted Triton to the Australian Customs and Border Protection Service to patrol Australia's northern waters as one of the service's fleet of patrol vessels. Australian Customs Vessel Triton has been fitted with two .50 calibre heavy machine guns and carries up to 28 armed customs officers. The ship arrived from the UK in mid-January 2007 and started operations immediately. Austere accommodation is provided for 100 embarked persons in addition to conventional accommodation for 45.

See also
 List of multihulls

References

Research vessels of the United Kingdom
Patrol vessels of the Marine Unit (Australian Border Force)
Trimarans
2000 ships
Military trimarans